Terquavion Smith (born December 31, 2002) is an American college basketball player for the NC State Wolfpack of the Atlantic Coast Conference (ACC).

College career
Smith attended Farmville Central High School in Farmville, North Carolina. As a senior, he was the Gatorade Basketball Player of the Year for North Carolina. He committed to NC State University to play college basketball.

As a freshman at NC State, Smith started 25 of 32 games, and averaged 16.3 points, 4.1 rebounds and 2.1 assists per game. He hit 96 three-pointers which were the fourth most by a freshman in ACC history. He originally entered the 2022 NBA draft, however he withdrew his name and returned to NC State for his sophomore year. During his sophomore year, he was injured in a game against rivals North Carolina and had to leave the court on a stretcher.

Career statistics

College

|-
| style="text-align:left;"| 2021–22
| style="text-align:left;"| NC State
| 32 || 25 || 31.6 || .398 || .369 || .698 || 4.1 || 2.1 || 1.3 || .5 || 16.3
|- class="sortbottom"
| style="text-align:center;" colspan="2"| Career
|| 32 || 25 || 31.6 || .398 || .369 || .698 || 4.1 || 2.1 || 1.3 || .5 || 16.3

References

External links
NC State Wolfpack bio

Living people
Guards (basketball)
Basketball players from North Carolina
NC State Wolfpack men's basketball players
2002 births